Mapandan, officially the Municipality of Mapandan, is a 3rd class municipality in the province of Pangasinan, Philippines. According to the 2020 census, it has a population of 38,058 people.

Mapandan is known for its yearly Pandan Festival.

Etymology
Mapandan (meaning plenty of pandan) got its name from “pandan”, a native palm which grew in abundance in the place at that time.  The leaves of the pandan add aroma to the cooked rice if cooked with it. The leaves are also stripped and woven into mats.

History
Mapandan was a former mere Barrio. That was former part of Municipality of Mangaldan.

Mapandan is a Hall of Famer for having the Pangasinan's cleanest, safest and greenest municipality (Category B). Mapandan was also awarded the Pangasinan's Healthiest Municipality for having the fewest malnourished children.

Geography
Mapandan is located in Eastern-Central part of Pangasinan. Bordered by Mangaldan to the north, Manaoag to the east, and Santa Barbara to the west and southern part. It is landlocked, however, it is not too far from nearby coastal areas of Dagupan, Binmaley and Mangaldan. Mapandan is a central hilly area, having several mountains nearby.

Barangays
Mapandan is politically subdivided into 15 barangays:

Climate

Demographics

Languages
Pangasinan and Ilocano are the two main spoken languages in the town, third is the Kapampangan Language. Filipino is also widely spoken in the town.

Religions
Major religions are in the town, with different branches of churches within.
 Seventh-day Adventist Church (Poblacion and Kolos-Pias)
Iglesia ni Cristo (Nilombot and Luyan)
The Grand Mosque (Luyan)
The Church of Jesus Christ of Latter Day Saints (Nilombot)
Kingdom hall of Jehovas Witnesses (Coral)
Roman Catholicism (Poblacion and Luyan)
Good news to the Nations Outreach (Poblacion)
Born Again Christianity (Poblacion)
God With Us Church(Aserda)

Roman Catholicism is the major Religion in Mapandan, annexed by different religions around.

Economy 

Mapandan is practically rural in terms of its area. It is composed of farming areas and cattle ranch farms. It has a little part of Bued river in northern part and an irrigation project also known as Payas irrigation project, which aims for a standard irrigation for farming areas in the municipality.

Government
Mapandan, belonging to the third congressional district of the province of Pangasinan, is governed by a mayor designated as its local chief executive and by a municipal council as its legislative body in accordance with the Local Government Code. The mayor, vice mayor, and the councilors are elected directly by the people through an election which is being held every three years.

Elected officials

Sister cities
These are cities Mapandan are associated with:
Hong Kong, China
Ontario, Canada

References

External links

 Mapandan Profile at PhilAtlas.com
 Municipal Profile at the National Competitiveness Council of the Philippines
 Mapandan at the Pangasinan Government Website
 Local Governance Performance Management System
 [ Philippine Standard Geographic Code]
 Philippine Census Information

Municipalities of Pangasinan